"Kissin' Cousins" is a song first recorded by Elvis Presley as the title track for the soundtrack of the 1964 motion picture Kissin' Cousins. The movie also featured a completely different song, titled "Kissin' Cousins (No. 2)", written by Bill Giant, Bernie Baum and Florence Kaye.

Writing and recording 
The song was written by Fred Wise and Randy Starr.
 The song was published by Elvis Presley's company Gladys Music, Inc.

Elvis Presley recorded his vocals for the song (over an earlier-recorded backing track) on October 10 (or possibly in the early morning of October 11), 1963.

Release history 
The song was first released as a single on February 10, 1964, with "It Hurts Me", a non-movie song, on the opposite side as RCA Victor 47–8307.

"Kissin' Cousins" peaked at number 12 on the Billboard Hot 100.
 ("It Hurts Me" also charted, peaking at number 29.)

The song's first LP release was in March 1964 on the Kissing Cousins soundtrack LP (LPM-2894 in mono and LSP-2894 in stereo).

On March 27, 1992, the single "Kissin' Cousins / It Hurts Me" was certified Gold by the RIAA for selling over 500,000 copies.

Critical reception 
Reviewing the single "Kissin' Cousings / It Hurts Me" in its February 15, 1964 issue, Billboard called the two songs "[t]wo more contenders for chart honors from Elvis."

Charts

References

External links 
 Elvis Presley - Kissin' Cousins / It Hurts Me at Discogs

1964 songs
1964 singles
Elvis Presley songs
RCA Records singles

Songs with lyrics by Fred Wise (songwriter)
Songs written by Randy Starr
Songs written for films
Songs about families
Songs about kissing